Kalateh-ye Bahar (also Romanized as Kalāteh-ye Bahār; also known as Bahār) is a village in Jargalan Rural District, Raz and Jargalan District, Bojnord County, North Khorasan Province, Iran. At the 2006 census, its population was 407, in 103 families.

References 

Populated places in Bojnord County